Stanoc i Poshtëm is a village in Vushtrri municipality, in Kosovo. It is located near the city of Vushtrri in the Mitrovica District of northeastern Kosovo. Together with the Upper Stanovc they made Stanoc, as a biggest villages in Kosovo. Stanovc is situated between the river Sitnica and the Pristina-Mitrovica road.

The village has a population of about 3700, and the land is mainly used for agriculture.

See also 
 Vushtrri
 Stanoc i Epërm

Notes

References

Villages in Vushtrri